Maximum Violence is American death metal band Six Feet Under's 3rd studio album. The album goes back to Chris Barnes' roots in Cannibal Corpse with violent themes/lyrics. It was also the first Six Feet Under album to feature Steve Swanson on guitars.

Track listing

Personnel
Six Feet Under
Chris Barnes - vocals
Steve Swanson - guitars
Terry Butler - bass
Greg Gall - drums

Additional musicians
Paul Booth - Backing vocals on "Feasting on the Blood of the Insane" and "Bonesaw"
Chris Carroll - Backing vocals on "Bonesaw"

Production
Produced by Brian Slagel
Engineered by Chris Carroll, Kieran Wagner and Luly Deya
Mixed by Brian Slagel and Chris Carroll
Mastered by Brad Vance
Artwork
Cover art by Paul Booth
Graphics by Brian Ames
Photography by Joe Giron

Trivia
"Torture Killer" inspired the band Torture Killer.
 The album cover art was illustrated by tattoo artist Paul Booth.

External links
 Six Feet Under's Home Page

Six Feet Under (band) albums
1999 albums
Metal Blade Records albums